Mello is a Portuguese surname. It's a popular name in Portugal and Brazil.

One of the oldest families of Portugal.

They come from D.Pero Formarigues de Guimarães, also called de Riba de Vizela (a place in the north of Portugal), for having lands there, a resident of Quinta do Paço de Urgezes and married with D.Gotinha, they had a son named D.Paio Pires de Guimarães (Guimarães is the first Portuguese city and capital, located in the north of Portugal), Lord of the house and the paternal lands in Riba de Vizela, which was received with D.Elvira Fernandes, daughter of D.Fernão Pires Tinhoso, butler of D.Afonso Henriques, 1st King of Portugal.

D.Paio Pires de Guimarães and his wife lived in Paço de Urgezes, near Guimarães, they had a son named D.Raimundo Pais de Riba de Vizela, He succeeded his parents and married D.Dórdia Afonso de Riba Douro, daughter of D.Afonso Viegas, also called Moço Viegas, and his wife, D.Aldara Pires, having a son D.Soeiro Raimundes de Riba de Vizela, a brave horseman, that seems to be the founder of the town of Mello, near Serra da Estrela (Mountain Range of the Star), which initially was called Merlo, the archaic form of melro - the blackbird (the blackbird is a typical bird in the sky of Portugal).

D.Soeiro Raimundes de Riba de Vizela married with D.Urraca Viegas Barroso, daughter of D.Egas Gomes Barroso and his wife, D.Urraca Vasques de Ambia, had a son, among other children, D.Mem Soares de Mello, Lord of the paternal house, of Mello and of Gouveia, a rich man, second lieutenant of D.Afonso III, 5th King of Portugal, he was at the conquest of Faro (the capital of Algarve, in the far south of the Portuguese region), was married with D.Teresa Afonso Gato, daughter of D.Afonso Pires Gato and his wife, D.Urraca Fernandes, they had children that followed with the surname de Mello, marking the beginning of the family.

(This text was taken from the Portuguese book "Armorial Lusitano" an Editorial Encyclopedia (1961) by Afonso Zúquete, António Faria, António Sergio and João Fonseca.)

People with the surname
 Alejandro Mello (born 1979), Uruguayan footballer who plays as a forward
 Anna Vania Mello (born 1979), Italian volleyball player
 Anthony de Mello (1931–1987), Jesuit priest, psychotherapist and writer
 Beevan D'Mello (born 1987), Indian footballer
 Branco Mello (born 1962), Brazilian rock singer/bassist
 Craig Mello (born 1960), Nobel Prize winner
 Dave Mello (born 1969), drummer of the punk/ska band Operation Ivy
 Dawn Mello (1931–2020), American fashion retail executive
 Dom Francisco Manuel de Mello, Portuguese writer
 Doug Mello, American soccer coach
 Evaldo Cabral de Mello (born 1936), Brazilian historian and history writer
 Fábio Mello (born 1975), Brazilian mixed martial artist
 Fernando Collor de Mello (born 1949), 32nd president of Brazil
 Francisco de Mello, Marquis of Terceira, Portuguese politician 
 Froilano de Mello (1887-1955), Goan microbiologist, professor, author and MP in the Portuguese Parliament
 Ingeborg Mello (1919–2009), Argentine track and field athlete
 Jeffrey Mello, American Episcopal priest (Bishop of Connecticut)
 Jim Mello (1920–2006), American football player
 Lois Snowe-Mello (1948–2016), American politician
 Mello (footballer, born 1992), Brazilian footballer
 Raphael Mello (born 1992), Brazilian football player for FC Cesarense
 Ricardo Mello (born 1980), Brazilian tennis player
 Sérgio Vieira de Mello (1948–2003), Brazilian United Nations employee
 Sophia de Mello Breyner Andresen (1919–2004), Portuguese writer
 Suzanne D'Mello (born 1978), Indian singer 
 Tamara Mello (born 1976), American actress
 Timothy J. Mello (born 1956), American mobster

External links 
 Mello at forebears.io

Portuguese-language surnames